Defending champion Andriy Medvedev defeated Goran Ivanišević in the final, 6–3, 6–2, 6–1 to win the singles tennis title at the 1995 Hamburg European Open.

Seeds
A champion seed is indicated in bold text while text in italics indicates the round in which that seed was eliminated.

Draw

Finals

Top half

Section 1

Section 2

Bottom half

Section 3

Section 4

External links
 1995 ATP German Open draw

Singles